The ribbon prickleback (Phytichthys chirus)  is a species of marine ray-finned fish belonging to the family Stichaeidae, the pricklebacks and shannies. It is the only species in the monospecific genus Phytichthys which is found in the northern North Pacific Ocean.

References

Xiphisterinae
Fish described in 1880